Viroqua is the county seat of Vernon County, Wisconsin, United States. The population was 4,504 at the 2020 census. The city is in the town of Viroqua.

Etymology
The town was originally named “Farwell” after Leonard J. Farwell, second Governor of Wisconsin, but it was renamed “Viroqua” in 1854. It is unclear why the name was changed, and the source of the name is uncertain. One legend states that Viroqua was the name of the daughter of Black Hawk, but this is not supported by evidence. Another story attributes the name to a Mohawk Indian actress who performed in a theater on the East Coast or in Brantford, Canada. However, the town most likely took its name from the fictional lead character of the 1848 novel Viroqua, or, the Flower of the Ottawas by Emma Carra.

History
The Native American Ho-Chunk people inhabited the area now known as Vernon County and the area of Viroqua. The Ho-Chunk, formerly known as the Winnebago, are a Siouan-speaking people who lived in the western Great Lakes region for thousands of years. The Ho-Chunk were removed westward beginning in the 1820s.

There was a sharp rivalry between Viroqua and Springville to be named the county seat of Vernon County. The land constituted what became known as the County Addition to the city of Viroqua.

Decker was one of the early settlers in the area. He arrived in 1847 and laid out the village of Viroqua. He died in 1860. Earlier settlers arrived in 1844 and built lumber mills on the Kickapoo River. Farmers began arriving in 1846, some of whom were John Graham, T.J. Defreese and William C. McMichael.

In early 1851, the act authorizing the organization of Bad Axe, now Vernon County, was approved by Governor Nelson Dewey. Viroqua was awarded the county seat, pending a permanent location to be determined by a vote. In May 1852, residents voted in favor of Viroqua. The present Vernon County Courthouse was built in Viroqua in 1880.

On June 28, 1865, Viroqua was hit by a deadly tornado that left 22 dead.

Geography
Viroqua is located at  (43.556534, -90.887663). The city is in the Driftless Region, near the western end of the Ocooch Mountains.

Climate

Demographics

2020 census
As of the census of 2020, the population was 4,504. The racial makeup of the city was 93.1% White, 1.1% Black or African American, 0.4% Asian, 0.2% Native American, 0.9% from other races, and 4.2% from two or more races. Ethnically, the population was 2.2% Hispanic or Latino of any race.

According  to the American Community Survey estimates for 2016-2020, the median income for a household in the city was $38,849, and the median income for a family was $55,075. Male full-time workers had a median income of $52,742 versus $39,178 for female workers. The per capita income for the city was $23,884. About 15.9% of families and 18.1% of the population were below the poverty line, including 14.5% of those under age 18 and 25.8% of those age 65 or over. Of the population age 25 and over, 94.3% were high school graduates or higher and 25.5% had a bachelor's degree or higher.

2010 census
As of the census of 2010, there were 4,362 people, 2,029 households, and 1,059 families residing in the city. The racial makeup of the city was 97.1% White, 0.6% African American, 0.3% Native American, 0.6% Asian, 0.1% Pacific Islander, 0.4% from other races, and 1.0% from two or more races. Hispanic or Latino of any race were 1.0% of the population.

There were 2,029 households, of which 25.5% had children under the age of 18 living with them, 39.0% were married couples living together, 10.0% had a female householder with no husband present, 3.2% had a male householder with no wife present, and 47.8% were non-families. 43.1% of all households were made up of individuals, and 23% had someone living alone who was 65 years of age or older. The average household size was 2.06 and the average family size was 2.86.

The median age in the city was 45 years. 21.6% of residents were under the age of 18; 6.2% were between the ages of 18 and 24; 22.4% were from 25 to 44; 26.3% were from 45 to 64; and 23.6% were 65 years of age or older. The gender makeup of the city was 46.1% male and 53.9% female.

2000 census
As of the census of 2000, there were 4,335 people, 1,990 households, and 1,112 families residing in the city. The population density was 1,327.3 people per square mile (511.9/km2). There were 2,105 housing units at an average density of 644.5 per square mile (248.5/km2). The racial makeup of the city was 98.73% White, 0.07% Black or African American, 0.16% Native American, 0.46% Asian, 0.18% from other races, and 0.39% from two or more races. 0.69% of the population were Hispanic or Latino of any race.

There were 1,990 households, out of which 24.5% had children under the age of 18 living with them, 43.6% were married couples living together, 9.3% had a female householder with no husband present, and 44.1% were non-families. 39.5% of all households were made up of individuals, and 22.7% had someone living alone who was 65 years of age or older. The average household size was 2.10 and the average family size was 2.81.

In the city, the population was spread out, with 21.4% under the age of 18, 7.5% from 18 to 24, 23.3% from 25 to 44, 21.6% from 45 to 64, and 26.2% who were 65 years of age or older. The median age was 44 years. For every 100 females, there were 82.7 males. For every 100 females age 18 and over, there were 77.8 males.

Transportation
Viroqua is at the intersection of U.S. Highway 14, U.S. Highway 61, Wisconsin Highway 27, Wisconsin Highway 56, and Wisconsin Highway 82.

Recently, the highways and major streets in Viroqua were redone. Highways 14, 61, and 27 had lanes added to them to become four lanes, except for the four block section of downtown. That was kept two lanes to allow for parallel parking on the side of the road.

Viroqua was on the new airways route between La Crosse, Wisconsin, and Rockford, Illinois, when it was established in June 1932. The beacon light had about 15 large  revolving beacons of 2,000,000 candle power when it was installed on the Mahlon Lepley farm, four miles (6 km) northeast of Viroqua.

Viroqua was formerly served by a Milwaukee Road branch line from Sparta via Leon, Melvina, Cashton and Westby.

Bus service
Commuter bus service towards La Crosse is provided seven times daily per direction by Scenic Mississippi Regional Transit.

Airport 
Viroqua is serviced by the Viroqua Municipal Airport (Y51).

Economy
Viroqua is an accredited Main Street America city. Its downtown is listed on the Wisconsin and National Register of Historic Places.

Viroqua was dubbed "The Town That Beat Walmart" by Smithsonian Magazine in 1992 because it fostered businesses that co-exist with the retail giant. The city and its nonprofit chamber of commerce, the Viroqua Chamber Main Street, actively promote small business development through several state and federal programs. One noteworthy program that has kept downtown storefronts occupied has been the Pop-Up Shop Initiative, which allow entrepreneurs to use a space downtown rent-free for the holiday season.

Viroqua is a site of food tourism, as surrounding Vernon County is home to one of the highest densities of organic farms in the country, with over 200 in the area.

Education
 Viroqua High School
 Viroqua Middle School
 Viroqua Elementary School
 Driftless Folk School
 Pleasant Ridge Waldorf School
 English Lutheran School
 Youth Initiative High School
 Laurel High School
 Better Futures High School
 Thoreau College
 Western Technical College offers classes in Viroqua

Culture
The Temple Theatre serves as an arts and cultural center for surrounding counties. A $1.6 million restoration of the 1922 classical revival style vaudeville and movie theater was driven by volunteers.

There are a large number of organic farms in the Driftless Region surrounding Viroqua, which supports startup business ventures, restaurants, and a budding tourism industry.

Notable people

Joseph D. Beck, U.S. Representative
J. Henry Bennett, legislator and lawyer
Cyrus M. Butt, legislator and lawyer
Henry Conner, legislator
Andrew H. Dahl, Wisconsin State Legislature
John Field, football player and coach, businessman
Frederick C. Finkle, geologist
Amos Fries, United States Army general
James Gillett, former Governor of California
Lawrence Grimsrud, legislator and lawyer
Frank Bateman Keefe, U.S. Representative
Meade Layne, early ufologist
Mark C. Lee, United States astronaut
Bernard Lewison, businessman and legislator
Craig Minowa, musician and environmental activist
Chris Mulkey, actor and musician, born in Viroqua
Oliver Munson, Wisconsin State Legislature
William Nelson, Wisconsin State Senator
Daniel B. Priest, lawyer and legislator
Brian Rude, Wisconsin State Legislature
Jeremiah McLain Rusk, governor of Wisconsin, Secretary of Agriculture
Lycurgus J. Rusk, Wisconsin legislator, soldier and lawyer
Rudy Silbaugh, Wisconsin State Legislature
Freddie Slack, American swing and boogie-woogie pianist and bandleader
August E. Smith, educator and legislator
Gerald L. K. Smith, founder of Share Our Wealth Movement, grew up in Viroqua
Jill Soltau, Former CEO of JCPenney 
J. Henry Tate, Wisconsin legislator and businessman
Thorleif T. Peterson Wisconsin state legislator and farmer
Richard Tubb, personal physician to former President George W. Bush
Butch Vig, record producer and musician
William V. Weber, Michigan State Representative
Jerome H. Wheelock, Wisconsin legislator and educator

Images

References

Further reading
 Macgregor, Lyn C. Habits of the Heartland: Small-Town Life in Modern America. Ithaca, NY: Cornell University Press, 2010. Sociological study of how differing notions of community shape social groups in Viroqua.
  Editorial critique of Macgregor's study.

External links

 Official website
Sanborn fire insurance maps: 1892 1900 1905 1911 1922

Cities in Wisconsin
Cities in Vernon County, Wisconsin
County seats in Wisconsin
Populated places established in 1844
1844 establishments in Wisconsin Territory